Nomiinae is a subfamily of sweat bees in the family Halictidae. There are about 11 genera and at least 550 described species in Nomiinae.

Genera
These 11 genera belong to the subfamily Nomiinae:
 Dieunomia Cockerell, 1899 i c g b
 Halictonomia Pauly, 1980 i c g
 Lipotriches Gerstäcker, 1858 i c g
 Mellitidia Guérin-Méneville, 1838 i c g
 Nomia Latreille, 1804 i c g b
 Pseudapis W. F. Kirby, 1900 i c g
 Ptilonomia Michener, 1965 i c g
 Reepenia Friese, 1909 i c g
 Spatunomia Pauly, 1980 i c g
 Sphegocephala Saussure, 1890 i c g
 Steganomus Ritsema, 1873 i c g
Data sources: i = ITIS, c = Catalogue of Life, g = GBIF, b = Bugguide.net

References

Further reading

External links

 

Halictidae
Articles created by Qbugbot